Aspidogyne is a genus of flowering plants from the orchid family, Orchidaceae. It includes about 40-50 species from Mexico, Central America, South America and Trinidad.

See also 
Aspidogyne mendoncae
List of Orchidaceae genera

References 

Pridgeon, A. M., Cribb, P. J., Chase, M. A. & Rasmussen, F. eds. (1999). Genera Orchidacearum 1. Oxford Univ. Press.
Pridgeon, A. M., Cribb, P. J., Chase, M. A. & Rasmussen, F. eds. (2001). Genera Orchidacearum 2. Oxford Univ. Press.
Pridgeon, A. M., Cribb, P. J., Chase, M. A. & Rasmussen, F. eds. (2003). Genera Orchidacearum 3. Oxford Univ. Press
Berg Pana, H. 2005. Handbuch der Orchideen-Namen. Dictionary of Orchid Names. Dizionario dei nomi delle orchidee. Ulmer, Stuttgart

External links 

 
Cranichideae genera
Orchids of Mexico
Orchids of Central America
Orchids of South America
Flora of Trinidad and Tobago
Taxa named by Leslie Andrew Garay